George A. Krug (October 13, 1897 – September 8, 1977) was an American lawyer, politician, and real estate broker from New York.

Life 
Krug was born on October 13, 1897 in Yonkers, New York, the son of merchant and town supervisor Alfred M. Krug.

During World War I, Krug enlisted as a private in the American Army. He was promoted to corporal and then sergeant, ultimately commanding a platoon that fought in the major engagements the American Army fought. After the Armistice, he studied law in Toulouse University in France. After returning to America, he studied at New York University School of Law. While attending school there in the evening, he worked during the day at a carpet shop, in the Gazette Press, and as a secretary for former Commissioner of Public Works See. He graduated from New York University in 1922 and after he was admitted to the bar he worked for the Westchester Title and Trust Company as a closing attorney.

In 1924, Krug was elected to the New York State Assembly as a Republican, representing the Westchester County 5th District. He served in the Assembly in 1925. In 1952, he moved to Berlin. He later settled in Sharpes, Florida, where he worked as a real estate broker.

Krug attended the Central Methodist Church. He was a member of the YMCA and Delta Chi. In 1920, he married Alinda Pearsall of Yonkers. Their children were Mrs. Janet M. Woods, George Jr., and Alfred. He was a commander and charter member of his local American Legion post and a 60-year member of his Freemason lodge.

Krug died in an Albany hospital on September 8, 1977. He was buried in Mt. Hope Cemetery in Hastings.

References

External links 

 The Political Graveyard

1897 births
1977 deaths
People from Yonkers, New York
United States Army personnel of World War I
University of Toulouse alumni
New York University School of Law alumni
20th-century American lawyers
New York (state) lawyers
20th-century American politicians
Politicians from Westchester County, New York
Republican Party members of the New York State Assembly
American real estate brokers
Methodists from New York (state)
American Freemasons
Burials in New York (state)